Abel de Saint-Brieuc was a Roman Catholic prelate who served as Auxiliary Bishop of Reims (1483–?).

Biography
Abel de Saint-Brieuc was ordained a priest in the Order of Preachers. On 22 Oct 1483, he was appointed by Pope Sixtus IV as Auxiliary Bishop of Reims and Titular Bishop of Dionysias. On 21 Dec 1483, he was consecrated bishop by Pierre Fridaricus, Bishop of Nisyros, with Orlando, Bishop of Vaison, and Basilio Gambone, Bishop of Ploaghe, serving as co-consecrators.

See also

References 

15th-century French Roman Catholic bishops
Bishops appointed by Pope Sixtus IV
Dominican bishops